Alaska Route 1 (AK-1) is a state highway in the southern part of the U.S. state of Alaska. It runs from Homer northeast and east to Tok by way of Anchorage. It is one of two routes in Alaska to contain significant portions of freeway: the Seward Highway in south Anchorage and the Glenn Highway between Anchorage and Palmer.

AK-1 is also known by the named highways it traverses:
 Sterling Highway from Homer to Tern Lake Junction
 Seward Highway from Tern Lake Junction to Anchorage 
 Glenn Highway from Anchorage to Glennallen
 Richardson Highway from Glennallen and Gakona Junction
 Tok Cut-Off from Gakona Junction to Tok

Route description

AK-1 begins at the Alaska Marine Highway's Homer Ferry Terminal at the tip of Homer Spit just south of the end of the Sterling Highway in Homer. It follows the entire Sterling Highway through Soldotna to the junction with the Seward Highway north of Seward, where it meets the north end of AK-9. There it turns north and follows the Seward Highway to its end in Anchorage, and follows the one-way pairs of Ingra and Gambell Streets and 6th and 5th Avenues, continuing east on 5th Avenue to the beginning of the Glenn Highway. AK-1 follows the entire length of the Glenn Highway, passing the south end of the George Parks Highway (AK-3) near Wasilla and meeting the Richardson Highway (AK-4) near Glennallen. A short concurrency north along AK-4 takes AK-1 to the Tok Cut-Off, which it follows northeast to its end at the Alaska Highway (AK-2) at Tok.

The majority of AK-1 is part of the Interstate Highway System; only the route between Homer and Soldotna does not carry an unsigned Interstate designation. The entire length of A-3 follows AK-1 from the Kenai Spur Highway in Soldotna to the turn in downtown Anchorage; there A-1 begins, running to Tok along AK-1. (A-1 continues to the Yukon border along AK-2, the Alaska Highway.) Only a short portion of the Seward Highway south of downtown Anchorage and a longer portion of the Glenn Highway northeast to AK-3 are built to freeway standards; the proposed Highway to Highway Connection would link these through downtown.

Major intersections

Tok Cut-Off

The road was built in the 1940s through challenging terrain, largely by battalions of Black engineers, including the 97th Engineer Battalion. in order to facilitate transport of World War II materiel in particular from ports such as Valdez and Anchorage to the interior. It was upgraded in the 1950s to better connect the Richardson Highway more directly with Tok. It was called a "cut-off" because it allowed motor traffic coming to and from Canada on the Alaska Highway, to drive directly northeast or southwest connect to or from Southcentral Alaska communities without driving all the way to or from the terminus of the Alaska highway in Delta Junction, then traveling northwest or southeast by the Richardson Highway, reducing  from the trip.

The 2002 Denali earthquake caused significant damage to the Cut-Off, particularly between mileposts 75 and 83 where major cracks and embankment slumping left the roadway fundamentally destroyed.

See also

References

External links

Copper River Census Area, Alaska
Expressways in the United States
Freeways in the United States
Homer, Alaska
Interstate Highways in Alaska
Southeast Fairbanks Census Area, Alaska
01
Transportation in Anchorage, Alaska
Transportation in Kenai Peninsula Borough, Alaska
Transportation in Matanuska-Susitna Borough, Alaska
Transportation in Unorganized Borough, Alaska